Hall of Fame Game may refer to one of the following games:

 Hall of Fame Game (baseball)
 Hall of Fame Game (hockey)
 Major League Soccer Hall of Fame Game
 Pro Football Hall of Fame Game

See also
Outback Bowl, an American college football bowl game in Tampa, Florida, called the Hall of Fame Bowl 1986–1994.
All-American Bowl, a former American college football bowl game in Birmingham, Alabama, called the Hall of Fame Classic 1977–1985.